Robert Jackson Staker (February 14, 1925 – November 30, 2008) was a United States district judge of the United States District Court for the Southern District of West Virginia.

Education and career

Staker was born in Kermit, West Virginia. He received a Bachelor of Laws from West Virginia University College of Law in 1952. He was in the United States Navy as a radioman from 1943 to 1946. He was in private practice of law in Williamson, West Virginia from 1952 to 1968. He was an assistant prosecuting attorney of Mingo County, West Virginia in 1960. He was a judge of the Circuit Court of Mingo County from 1969 to 1979.

Federal judicial service

Staker was nominated by President Jimmy Carter on June 14, 1979, to the United States District Court for the Southern District of West Virginia, to a new seat created by 92 Stat. 1629. He was confirmed by the United States Senate on September 11, 1979, and received his commission on September 13, 1979. He assumed senior status on December 31, 1994. His service was terminated on September 30, 2005, due to retirement.

Death

Staker died on November 30, 2008, in South Point, Ohio.

References

Sources
 

1925 births
2008 deaths
Military personnel from West Virginia
United States Navy personnel of World War II
County prosecuting attorneys in West Virginia
Judges of the United States District Court for the Southern District of West Virginia
People from Williamson, West Virginia
United States district court judges appointed by Jimmy Carter
20th-century American judges
United States Navy sailors
West Virginia circuit court judges
West Virginia lawyers
West Virginia University College of Law alumni